Celebes TV is a local television station serving Makassar, South Sulawesi, Indonesia. Celebes TV is in channel 28 UHF and broadcasts in six regencies/cities in South Sulawesi, namely Makassar, Maros, Pangkep, Barru, Gowa, Takalar, Pare-Pare and Jeneponto.

History 
Celebes TV was established in 2009 by the senior television journalist Husain Abdullah, Muannas, Muhammad Hasrul and Kamaluddin Rahman, the spirit of young Makassar and the national television media, make the celebes TV more color and quickly received the South Sulawesi community. Initially this television is named Youth TV (meaningful of the Television Team (KDNa Teven Television (EDP) at the Governor of South Sulawesi. Governor coincides the day of the Youth Volvenies 28 October 2009. Ahead of the television name turns into a Celebes TV. Celebes not only meaningful areas or areas that appoint the island of Sulawesi, but also meaningful spirit of great living to compete and survival. The first year of television run by Makassar young people immediately sobbing 4 award of KPID (Indonesia Regional Broadcasting and Information) Award in 2010.

Program Events

NeWS

Everyday,
 At: 06.30WiTA

Everyday, 
 At: 07.00WiTA

Everyday, 
 At: 12.00WiTA

Everyday, 
 At: 14.00WiTA

Everyday, 
 At: 18.30WiTA

Everyday 
 At: 24.00WiTA

Everyday, 
 Every HourS

Everyday, 
 Every HourS

Everyday, 
 At: 11.30WiTA

Talkshow 
Celebes Informal Meeting
OMB (Roundtable Chat)

Interactive 
Chat Karebosi
Makassar Corner aired every Monday-Friday from 9:00 till 10:00 pm
Talk Healthy aired every Saturday at 09:00 till 10:00 pm

Comedy Variety Show

Music 
Celebes Music
Korea
West / Overseas / UK
Indonesia

Sinema Pilihan (Drama Korea) 
 Damo:The Legendary Police Woman
 Delicious Proposal
 Song of the Prince
 Guardian Angel (aired 2 times)
 Stairway to heaven
 Super Rookie
 iljimae
 Alone in Love

Religion 
 Ping Ustadz
 Ngaji Yuk!
 Kultum
 Fun Berislam (Asiknya Berislam)
 Roads Hidayah (Jalan Hidayah)

Reality Show 
Mic Shocked/Mig Kaget

Feature 
Menu Options
Ideal Home

InfoNewsmercial 
 Editorial
 LEJEL home shopping

Sport 
Golo

Magazine TV 
 File Celebes
 Celebes Heritage
 Celebes Community
 Auto Mania
 Plesiran
 Product Info
 Talent Teens
 Did you know
 Inspiring Leaders
 Bumi Hijau TV

Investigation 
Celebes investigative
Hot Issue

temporary program 
Siaran Launching NET TV

The event ever aired 
 Squire Jacky or (Juragan Jacky)
 Traces of the Prophet (Prophet Yusuf.a.s Movie Rerun)
 Stand Up Comedy In Celebes
 OKB (The New Rich) (broadcast relay TRANS7)
 Earth Report (relay TVE)
 G News
 Trending Topic
 Jazz & Democracy
 Women Talk Sulawesi
 Kitchen Pantun (DPR) 0R Dapur Pantun Rakyat (DPR)

Ramadan program that aired 
Sahur - Sahuur
Cinema Special options Ramadan
Traces of the Prophet
Ngabuburit
Dasyatnya Ramadan
From mosque to mosque
Fun Berislam
Roads Hidayah

Transmission hours 
Celebes TV has been airing from 06:20 to 22:00 in local time.

See also
List of television stations in Indonesia

References

External links 
Official Site Celebes TV 
Celebes Online

Television stations in Indonesia
Television channels and stations established in 2011
Mass media in Makassar